Robert L. Freeman (born March 9, 1956) is a Democratic member of the Pennsylvania House of Representatives. He currently serves as the Democratic Chair of the House Local Government Committee. In 2003, the political website PoliticsPA named him as a possible successor to House Minority Leader Bill DeWeese.

References

External links
Pennsylvania House of Representatives - Robert L. Freeman (Democrat) official PA House website
Pennsylvania House Democratic Caucus - Robert L. Freeman official Party website

1956 births
Living people
21st-century American politicians
Easton Area High School alumni
Democratic Party members of the Pennsylvania House of Representatives
Politicians from Northampton County, Pennsylvania